Walch is a surname. Notable people with the surname include:

 Clemens Walch (born 1987), Austrian footballer
 Christian Wilhelm Franz Walch (1726–1784), German theologian
 Ernst Walch (born  1956), Liechtenstein diplomat
 Garnet Walch (1843–1913), Australian writer
 Hynden Walch, American actress
 Johann Ernst Immanuel Walch (1725–1778), German theologian
 Johann Georg Walch (1693–1775), German theologian
 Johann Heinrich Walch (1776–1855), German conductor and composer
 Megan Walch (born 1967), Australian artist

Other
 Walch Firearms & Co., a firearms manufacturer who created the Walch Revolver

See also 
 Walsh (disambiguation)
 Welch (disambiguation)
 Walcher (disambiguation)
 Walker (disambiguation)

German-language surnames
Ethnonymic surnames